Bosara bursalobata is a moth in the family Geometridae. It is found on Borneo and Bali. The habitat consists of upper montane forests.

The length of the forewings is 7–8 mm.

References

Moths described in 1997
Eupitheciini
Moths of Indonesia